Khinu Langwa Limbu is a Nepalese politician belonging to CPN (Unified Socialist). She is also serving as member of Provincial Assembly. 

She is currently serving as Minister for Culture and Tourism of Province No. 1.

Electoral history

2017 Nepalese provincial elections

See also 

 CPN (Unified Socialist) 
 Jhala Nath Khanal

References 

Communist Party of Nepal (Unified Socialist) politicians
Year of birth missing (living people)
Living people
Provincial cabinet ministers of Nepal
Members of the Provincial Assembly of Koshi Province